Ouay Ketusingh (3 September 1908 – 20 December 1990) was a Thai physician, known for shaping medical education at the Siriraj Hospital Faculty of Medicine where he was a professor, applying Buddhist philosophy to medicine, pioneering research and applying modern scientific methods to traditional Thai medicine, establishing the field of sports medicine in Thailand, and various other innovations.

References

Ouay Ketusingh
Ouay Ketusingh
Ouay Ketusingh
Ouay Ketusingh
Ouay Ketusingh
Ouay Ketusingh
1908 births
1990 deaths